Gerald McGhee (15 August 1962 – 25 August 2020) was a British-Canadian singer who was best known as the lead vocalist for the Canadian hard rock band Brighton Rock.

Brighton Rock has so far released three albums and an EP throughout their career, their most successful album being Take a Deep Breath, released in 1988. It charted at number 22 in Canada and was certified Gold by the CRIA. The album also spawned the hit single "One More Try". Brighton Rock broke up in 1991, and reunited in 2002.

McGhee died of cancer on 25 August 2020.

Discography

With Brighton Rock
Studio albums
 Young, Wild and Free (1986)
 Take a Deep Breath (1988)
 Love Machine (1991)
EP
 Brighton Rock (1985)
Live album
 A Room For Five Live (2002)

See also
 Brighton Rock

References

External links
 

20th-century Scottish male singers
Musicians from Glasgow
1962 births
2020 deaths
20th-century Canadian male singers